Arthur Cockram (8 April 1908 – 19 October 1968) was an Australian rules footballer who played for the Fitzroy Football Club in the Victorian Football League (VFL).

Notes

External links 
		

1908 births
1968 deaths
Australian rules footballers from Victoria (Australia)
Fitzroy Football Club players